17α-Hydroxypregnenolone is a pregnane (C21) steroid that is obtained by hydroxylation of pregnenolone at the C17α position.  This step is performed by the mitochondrial cytochrome P450 enzyme 17α-hydroxylase (CYP17A1)  that is present in the adrenal and gonads. Peak levels are reached in humans at the end of puberty and then decline. High levels are also achieved during pregnancy. It is also a known neuromodulator.

Prohormone
17α-Hydroxypregnenolone  is considered a prohormone in the formation of dehydroepiandrosterone (DHEA), itself a prohormone of the sex steroids.

This conversion is mediated by the enzyme 17,20 lyase. As such 17α-hydroxypregenolone represents an intermediary in the Δ5 pathway that leads from pregnenolone to DHEA. 17α-Hydroxypregneolone is also converted to 17α-hydroxyprogesterone, a prohormone for glucocorticosteroids and androstenedione through the activity of 3α-hydroxysteroid dehydrogenase.

Clinical use
Measurements of 17α-hydroxypregnenolone are useful in the diagnosis of certain forms of congenital adrenal hyperplasia.
In patients with congenital adrenal hyperplasia due to 3β-hydroxysteroid dehydrogenase deficiency 17α-hydroxypregnenolone is increased, while in patients with congenital adrenal hyperplasia due to 17α-hydroxylase deficiency levels are low to absent.

Neurosteroid 
17α-hydroxypregnenolone is a known neuromodulator as its acts in the central nervous system. Specifically, it is known to modulate locomotion.

See also 
 Congenital adrenal hyperplasia
 Narave pig, intersex pigs that have low levels of 17α-Hydroxypregnenolone

Additional images

References 

Pregnane X receptor agonists
Pregnanes